Abdelatif Bahdari (born 20 February 1984) is a Palestinian professional footballer who plays as a centre back for Markaz Balata. From 2007 to 2020, he earned 71 caps for Palestine national football team.

Club career

Al-Wehdat
Bahdari began his fully fledged professional career when he moved to Jordanian powerhouse Al-Wahdat in the summer of 2009. His athleticism and power saw him become an automatic starter. In his first year, Bahdari and fellow countryman Ahmed Keshkesh helped Al-Wahdat secure the Jordan FA Cup. The 2010–11 season saw Bahdari move from strength to strength as an integral part of Al-Wahdat's historic quadruple winning team under the guidance of Croatian manager Dragan Talajic. In the league, Bahdari was part of a defence that conceded a mere 16 goals in 20 games, he also did his part on the other end of the pitch scoring twice in the league, once in the Cup semifinal against Kfarsoum, and the winner in the 2011 AFC Cup second round against Shurtan Guzar.

Hajer
Bahdari's fantastic season saw him attract the attention of many clubs in the West Bank, Kuwait, and Saudi Arabia. It was initially thought that Bahdari would join former manager Dragan Talajic at Kuwait SC. He was also heavily linked with Kuwaiti club Al-Nasr, he eventually signed with Shabab Al-Khaleel of the West Bank Premier League but the contract included a get-out clause if Bahdari received a professional contract from a club  based abroad. On 1 July 2011 Bahdari signed a two-year deal with newly promoted Hajer Club of the Saudi Professional League. His salary (a rumored $280,000/yr.) would make him the best paid Palestinian athlete.

Bahdari captained Hajer on more than one occasion and was crucial in securing a second season in the Saudi topflight for the Al-Hasa-based side. Bahdari's was Hajer's second top-scorer with 3 league goals and was second, behind Tawfiq Buhumaid in total minutes played. Bahdari was never substituted in his 22 league appearances. He was only held out of 4 league matches due to card accumulation, threat of card accumulation, or injury.

International career
Abdelatif Bahdari captained the Palestinian national team in their first home World Cup qualifier against Afghanistan on 3 July 2011 in the absence of regular captain Ramzi Saleh. He took over the captaincy on a full-time basis in 2015 during 2018 FIFA World Cup qualification

International goals
Scores and results list Palestine's goal tally first.

Honours

Personal 
Best Player, Bangabandhu Gold Cup: 2018

Club

Al-Wehdat 

Jordan Premier League: 2010–11, 2014–15
Jordan FA Cup: 2009–10, 2010–11
Jordan FA Shield: 2010
Jordan Super Cup: 2009, 2010
West Bank Premier League: 2015/16

National team
AFC Challenge Cup: 2014
Bangabandhu Gold Cup: 2018

References

External links

1984 births
Living people
Palestinian footballers
Palestine international footballers
Association football central defenders
Markaz Shabab Al-Am'ari players
Hajer FC players
Al-Wehdat SC players
Shabab Al-Khalil SC players
West Bank Premier League players
Palestinian expatriate footballers
Expatriate footballers in Jordan
Expatriate footballers in Saudi Arabia
Expatriate footballers in Iraq
Palestinian expatriate sportspeople in Jordan
Palestinian expatriate sportspeople in Saudi Arabia
Palestinian expatriate sportspeople in Iraq
2015 AFC Asian Cup players
Footballers at the 2006 Asian Games
Saudi Professional League players
Footballers at the 2018 Asian Games
2019 AFC Asian Cup players
Asian Games competitors for Palestine